Henry Douglas Brown (born 1941 in Ngawi)  is a professor emeritus of English as a Second Language at Yogyakarta State University. He was the president of International TESOL from 1980 to 1981, and in 2001 he received TESOL's James E. Alatis Award for Distinguished Service.

Notable Books 
 Brown, D. H. (2014). Principles of Language Learning and Teaching (6th Edition) (6th ed.). Pearson Education ESL.
 Brown, D. H., & Lee, H. (2015). Teaching by Principles: An Interactive Approach to Language Pedagogy (4th Edition) (4th ed.). Pearson Education ESL.
 Brown, D. H., & Abeywickrama, P. (2019). Language Assessment: Principles and Classroom Practices (2nd Edition) (2nd ed.). Pearson Education ESL.

References 

1941 births
Living people
Linguists from the United States
Bilingualism and second-language acquisition researchers
Teachers of English as a second or foreign language
San Francisco State University faculty
Developmental psycholinguists
Academic staff of Yogyakarta State University